Valley Station signal box is a Grade II listed, 2-story, timber built signal box located near the railway station in Valley, Anglesey.

Located directly north west of the level crossing on the B4545 road, the Signal Box is thought to have been built in the middle of the 19th century as one of 15 new huts built along the Chester and Holyhead Railway.

Clad with horizontal tongue and groove panelling, with large sash windows and a slate roof. The interior of the signal box remain unchanged and still features the original lever frames.

References

Grade II listed buildings in Anglesey